Ban Bueng is a district (amphoe) of Chonburi province, Thailand.

Geography 
The district is in the center of Chonburi Province in the Khao Khiao Massif area.

Neighboring districts are (from the north clockwise) Phan Thong, Phanat Nikhom, Bo Thong, Nong Yai, Si Racha and Mueang Chonburi.

History 
The district was created in 1921 as a minor district (king amphoe). 1938 it was elevated to full district status.

Administration 
The district is divided into eight sub-districts (tambons), which are further subdivided into 52 villages (mubans). Ban Bueng itself has town (thesaban mueang) status and covers parts of tambon Ban Bueng. Nong Phai Kaeo and Khlong Kio each have township (thesaban tambon) status, both townships covering parts of the same-named tambon.

References 

Ban Bueng